A cricket team representing the Essex Cricket Board played seven List A cricket matches between 1999 and 2003. This is a list of the players who appeared in those matches.

Mohammad Akhtar, 1 match, 2003 
Adnan Akram, 2 matches, 2002–2003
Arfan Akram, 2 matches, 2002–2003
Tauseef Ali, 2 matches, 2002–2003
Ravi Bopara, 1 match, 2001 
Nicholas Carlier, 3 matches, 1999–2000
John Chambers, 1 match, 2001 
Andrew Churchill, 4 matches, 1999–2001
Andrew Clarke, 1 match, 2001 
Alastair Cook, 1 match, 2003 
Giles Ecclestone, 5 matches, 1999–2001
Rory Ellison, 1 match, 2001 
Simon Fitzgerald, 4 matches, 1999–2001
Ian Flanagan, 1 match, 2001 
Devang Gandhi, 2 matches, 2001 
Andrew Hibbert, 4 matches, 1999–2001
Mel Hussain, 1 match, 2001 
Gareth James, 2 matches, 2002–2003
Saad Janjua, 2 matches, 2002–2003
Timothy Jones, 3 matches, 1999–2000
Andrew Kennedy, 3 matches, 2001–2003
Andrew MacKinlay, 4 matches, 1999–2001
Simon Moore, 4 matches, 2000–2001
Graham Napier, 1 match, 2000 
Tony Palladino, 2 matches, 2002–2003
Duncan Paveling, 2 matches, 2001–2002
Alex Richards, 6 matches, 1999–2003
Arif Saeed, 3 matches, 1999–2001
Christopher Sains, 1 match, 2000 
Christopher Sharp, 1 match, 1999 
Royston Smith, 3 matches, 2000–2002
Jamie Sparrow, 1 match, 1999 
Jamie Went, 1 match, 2003 
Chris White, 1 match, 2002 
Chris Williams, 1 match, 2002

References

Essex Cricket Board